Sindustries is the third album by Swedish melodic death metal band Gardenian. For a time, this was considered Gardenian's last release, as the band broke up in 2004. However, they reunited in 2012 and are working towards a new album. The band's past album, Soulburner, featured Eric Hawk, who did clean vocals, but producer Peter Tägtgren believed that this album did not need a guest clean vocalist, and encouraged Jim Kjell to the clean vocals this time as he had never done so. This is the first and last release with Kriss Albertsson performing. This album also has the band's longest song, "Selfproclaimed Messiah".

Track listing
 "Selfproclaimed Messiah" - 8:06
 "Doom & Gloom" - 6:34
 "Long Snap to Zero" - 6:07
 "Courageous" - 4:42
 "Heartless" - 6:34
 "The Suffering" - 6:21
 "Scissorfight" - 5:35
 "Sonic Death Monkey" - 5:54
 "Sindustries" - 6:51
 "Funeral" - 6:20

Credits
Gardenian 
 Jim Kjell - vocals, guitars
 Niklas Engelin - guitars
 Kriss Albertsson - bass
 Thim Blom - drums

Guests
 Niklas Sundin - art direction, design
 Lars Szöke - engineer, acoustic guitar
 Peter Tagtgren - keyboards, programming, producing, mixing

Gardenian albums
2000 albums
Albums produced by Peter Tägtgren